George "Tiny" Hobbs (March 23, 1907 – January 30, 1962) was an Irish-born railway engineer and political figure in British Columbia. He represented Revelstoke in the Legislative Assembly of British Columbia from 1960 to 1962 as a Co-operative Commonwealth Federation (CCF) member.

He was born in County Wexford and was educated there. After coming to Canada, Hobbs married Margaret Jackson, a school teacher. He worked from the Canadian Pacific Railway at Revelstoke. Hobbs served as a school trustee for Revelstoke from 1948 to 1960. He died suddenly in office in 1962 and his wife was elected to represent Revelstoke in the by-election that followed.

References 

1907 births
1962 deaths
British Columbia Co-operative Commonwealth Federation MLAs
20th-century Canadian politicians
Irish emigrants to Canada